Robert Edward Cox (December 22, 1876April 24, 1937) was a sailor serving in the United States Navy who received the Medal of Honor for bravery.

Biography
On April 13, 1904, the Missouri was engaging in target practice when one of the ships 12" guns "flared back". As the breech was opened for reloading, hot gases were released into the turret, causing it to catch fire. The fire spread to a bag of propellant and from there it spread down to the ammunition handling chamber. Cox along with 2 gunners mates contained the fire before it spread to other areas of the ship and in putting out the blaze. The fire was eventually contained but before it was out 36 of the ship's crew were dead. For his actions he received the Medal of Honor April 14, 1921.

He died April 24, 1937, and is buried in Rose Hill Cemetery Altoona, Pennsylvania.

Medal of Honor citation
Rank and organizarion: Chief Gunner's Mate, U.S. Navy. Born: 22 December 1855, St. Albans, W. Va. Accredited to: West Virginia. G.O. No.: 43, 14 April 1921. (Medal presented by President Harding.)

Citation:

For extraordinary heroism on U.S.S. Missouri 13 April 1904. While at target practice off Pensacola, Fla., an accident occurred in the after turret of the Missouri whereby the lives of 5 officers and 28 men were lost. The ship was in imminent danger of destruction by explosion, and the prompt action of C.G. Cox and 2 gunners' mates caused the fire to be brought under control, and the loss of the Missouri, together with her crew, was averted.

See also

 List of Medal of Honor recipients during peacetime

References

External links
 
 

1876 births
1937 deaths
United States Navy Medal of Honor recipients
United States Navy chiefs
American military personnel of the Spanish–American War
Burials in Pennsylvania
Military personnel from West Virginia
People from St. Albans, West Virginia
Non-combat recipients of the Medal of Honor